This is a list of the first minority male lawyer(s) and judge(s) in the Territories of the U.S. It includes the year in which the men were admitted to practice law (in parentheses). Also included are other distinctions such as the first minority men in their state to graduate from law school or become a political figure.

American Samoa

Lawyer 

 Peter Tali Coleman (1951): First Samoan male lawyer in American Samoa. He was later appointed as the first Governor of American Samoa (1989)

Judge 

 Michael Kruse (1972): First Samoan male to be appointed as a Justice of the High Court of American Samoa (1987)

Attorney General 

 Peter Tali Coleman (1951): First Samoan male to serve as the Attorney General for American Samoa

Political Office 

Peter Tali Coleman (1951): First Samoan male to serve as the Governor of American Samoa (1989)

Guam

Judicial Officer

Justice of the Peace 

 Joaquín Cruz Pérez: First Guamanian male to serve as the Justice of the Peace in Guam (1899)

Judge 

 Pancracio Palting: First Filipino male judge in Guam before the court system was later reorganized (c. 1920s)

Justice 

 Joaquín Cruz Pérez: First Guamanian male to serve as an Associate Justice for Guam (1915)
 Joaquin Perez: First Chamorro male appointed as the Presiding Judge of the Superior Court of Guam (1974)
Benjamin Cruz (1975): First openly LGBT male appointed as an Associate Justice of the Supreme Court of Guam (1997)

Island Attorney 

 Vicente C. Reyes: First male Island Attorney (or Attorney General) in Guam. He would later be appointed as a judge in 1947 before the court system was reorganized.

Attorney General 

Douglas Moylan: First Guamanian male lawyer to be appointed as the Attorney General of Guam (2003-2007)

Northern Mariana Islands

Lawyer 

 Edward Pangelinan: First Chamorro male lawyer in the Northern Mariana Islands

Judge 

 Alfred Laureta: First Filipino American appointed as a Judge of the U.S. District Court for the Northern Mariana Islands (1978)

Attorney General 

Edward Manibusan: First Chamorro male lawyer to be elected as the Attorney General of the Northern Mariana Islands (2015). He also served as a judge during the course of his career.

Puerto Rico

Lawyer 

 Benito Díaz Pares (1841): First native-born lawyer in Puerto Rico

Judge 

Clemente Ruiz Nazario (1921): First Puerto Rican male appointed as a Judge of the U.S. District Court for the District of Puerto Rico (1952)
Juan R. Torruella (1957): First Puerto Rican male appointed as a Judge of the U.S. Court of Appeals for the First Circuit (1984) and to serve as its Chief Judge (1994)

United States Virgin Islands 

William H. Hastie (1931): First African American male appointed as a Judge of the U.S. District Court of the Virgin Islands (1937)

See also 

 List of first minority male lawyers and judges in the United States

Other topics of interest 

 List of first women lawyers and judges in the United States
 List of first women lawyers and judges in the Territories of the U.S.

References 

 
Minority, US Territories, first
Minority, US Territories, first
American Samoan lawyers
Guamanian lawyers
Northern Mariana Islands lawyers
Puerto Rican lawyers